Heterographa is a genus of moths of the family Noctuidae.

Species
 Heterographa fabrilis (Püngeler, 1909)
 Heterographa sibirica Staudinger, 1896
 Heterographa tetrastigma Brandt, 1941
 Heterographa thoenyi Ronkay, Varga & Gyulai, 2002
 Heterographa tumulorum Boursin, 1936
 Heterographa zelleri (Christoph, 1877)

References
Natural History Museum Lepidoptera genus database
Heterographa at funet

Hadeninae